The 2022 Vale of Glamorgan Council election took place as of 5 May 2022 to elect 54 members across 24 wards to Vale of Glamorgan Council. On the same day, elections were held to the other 21 local authorities and to community councils in Wales as part of the 2022 Welsh local elections. The previous Vale of Glamorgan all-council election took place in May 2017 and future elections will take place every five years.

Background
Council elections in Wales were originally scheduled for May 2021, but were delayed to avoid a conflict with the 2021 Senedd election. The frequency of the elections was also increased from 4 years to five years to avoid future clashes, meaning (after 2022) the next council election is expected in 2027. The number of councillors was increased from 47 to 54 at the 2022 election, with a number of ward changes to ensure better electoral parity.

The council has been in no overall control since the 2012 election. Following the 2017 Vale of Glamorgan Council election the Conservatives held 23 out of 47 seats on the Council and formed a minority administration led by John Thomas, who replaced Labour's Neil Moore. After the Conservative local councillor for Rhoose resigned over plans to shut Llancarfan's primary school, the February 2019 by-election returned former Welsh Conservatives leader Andrew R. T. Davies, who also opposed the closure. Davies and 3 other Conservative councillors then blocked the council's budget for the financial year. Anger over plans for parking also contributed to what a Local Democracy Reporting Service reporter called "serious discontent" between Thomas and other councillors in the party by April 2019.

As result, local Conservative Party members voted at their 29 April annual meeting to replace Thomas with Vincent Bailey as leader, and Thomas then confirmed his resignation as council leader. On 8 May, all six members of the council's cabinet, including Thomas, joined councillors Michael Morgan and Kathryn McCaffer in leaving the Conservative group on the council to sit as independents in a Vale Independents Group led by Ben Gray. Wales Online described the move as similar to the formation of The Independent Group for Change in UK politics. The newly independent councillors formed a coalition to take over running the council on 20 May 2019 with Llantwit First Independents and Labour, led by Neil Moore again. This administration continued until the 2022 election.

Candidates by party
A total of 168 candidates were standing for the 54 seats on the council (an average of 3.1 candidates per seat). Nine political parties were standing candidates in this election, plus 12 independent candidates.

The Conservatives were standing the full 54 candidates and were the only party to be standing a candidate in every ward. Of the other parties, Labour (43 candidates), Plaid Cymru (33 candidates) and the Green Party (17 candidates) were all standing in 50% or more of wards. The Llantwit First Independents were standing four candidates in the Llantwit Major ward, and there were a further 12 independent candidates (six of whom were elected as Conservative councillors are the previous election).  Liberal Democrats were standing two candidates, while Abolish, Propel and Reform UK are standing one candidate each.

Overview of results
Vale of Glamorgan Council remained in no overall control following this election. Labour became the largest party at the election with 25 seats - 3 seats short of a majority. This represented an increase of 11 seats on 2017, winning 6 seats from the Conservatives, 1 previously held by an independent, and 4 of the seats which were newly created by boundary changes.

The Conservatives held 13 seats, losing 10 seats they had won in 2017 (6 to Labour, 3 to Plaid and 1 to an independent candidate who had previously been elected as a Conservative). Plaid Cymru increased their share to 8 councillors, holding their 4 seats from 2017, winning 3 seats from the Conservatives and winning 1 seat which was newly created by boundary changes. The Llantwit First Independents retained all four of their councillors and did not contest any other seats. Independent councillor Kevin Mahoney retained his seat in Sully ward, while the other independent candidate in that ward did not stand for re-election and the second seat there was a gain for Labour. Two new independent councillors were elected for seats which were newly created by boundary changes: Samantha Campbell took additional seat in Rhoose and Ian Perry won the new single-seat ward of St Nicholas & Llancarfan. 

|}

Candidates and results by ward
* = sitting councillor in this ward prior to election

Baruc (3 seats)
In the run-up to the election, the Labour candidate Ziad Alsayed was suspended by the party. In separate tweets he had called Volodymyr Zelensky,  president of Ukraine, a "fascist" and a "Zionist". He had also described Labour leader Keir Starmer as "disgusting".

Buttrills (2 seats)

Cadoc (4 seats)

Castleland (2 seats)

Cornerswell (2 seats)

Court (2 seats)

Cowbridge (3 seats)
Candidates Geoff Cox, Hunter Jarvie and Andrew Carey Parker appear on the ballot with a blank description (having been elected as Conservative councillors in the 2017 election), while Alec Trousdell has the description "Independent/Annibynnol".

Dinas Powys (4 seats)

Dyfan (2 seats)

Gibbonsdown (2 seats)

Illtyd (3 seats)

Llandough (1 seat)

Llandow (1 seat)

Llantwit Major (4 seats)

Peterston-Super-Ely (1 seat)
Michael Morgan was elected as a Conservative councillor in the 2017 election, and held his seat in this election. Morgan's share of the vote dropped by 19.0% on 2017.

Plymouth (2 seats)
Ben Gray and Kathryn McCaffer were elected as a Conservative councillor in the 2017 election.

Rhoose (3 seats)

St Athan (2 seats)
St Athan's seats increased from one in 2017 to two at this election.

St Augustines (3 seats)
Green candidate Anthony Slaughter was the leader of the Wales Green Party during this election.

St Brides Major (2 seats)

St Nicholas & Llancarfan (1 seat)
St Nicholas & Llancarfan ward was newly created for this election; Gordon Kemp was a sitting councillor for Rhoose ward prior to this election. Ian Perry previously unsuccessfully stood as a Plaid Cymru candidate in Wenvoe ward in 2017.

Stanwell (2 seats)

Sully (2 seats)

Wenvoe (1 seat)

See also
 Vale of Glamorgan Council

References

Vale of Glamorgan
Vale of Glamorgan Council elections